Colonia Claudia Ara Agrippinensium was the Roman colony in the Rhineland from which the city of Cologne, now in Germany, developed.

It was usually called Colonia (colony) and was the capital of the Roman province of Germania Inferior and the headquarters of the military in the region. With administrative reforms under Diocletian it became the capital of Germania Secunda. Many artefacts from the ancient city survive, including the arch of the former city gate with the inscription 'CCAA', which is today housed in the Romano-Germanic Museum.

Historical background

Oppidum Ubiorum  (Latin city of Ubii), Ara Ubiorum and Apud Aram Ubiorum

A Germanic tribe known as the Eburones had originally inhabited the present-day Cologne Lowland. But they were wiped out in a war of reprisal carried out by Julius Caesar. In 38 BC, the Germanic tribe known as the Ubii, who inhabited the right bank of the Rhine, were resettled by the Roman General Marcus Vipsanius Agrippa in the lands in the Cologne Lowland vacated by the Eburones. This brought the Ubii within Roman-occupied territory.

The Ubii chose an island in the Rhine as the central location of their settlement area. The island was a natural rise that was protected from flooding. The location of the settlement no longer exists today but it roughly comprises the area between the areas of the Heumarkt and the Alter Markt sections of the old city of Cologne. The settlement can be dated by archeological finds to the first half of the 1st century AD. By this time the typical Roman grid-style street plan was already in use. The settlement's assumed name is probably Oppidum Ubiorum (Settlement of the Ubii). The Roman epoch of the history of the city of Cologne begins with this oppidum.

During the rule of Augustus (30 BC to AD 14), the Ara Ubiorum (Altar of the Ubii) was constructed within the city limits. This altar was possibly foreseen as the central place of worship for a greater Germanic province, which would comprise lands across the Rhine, which remained unconquered at this point. The noble Segimundus is mentioned as the priest of the Ara in the year AD 9. He was from the family of Arminius, leader of the Cherusci. After Arminius' victory over Publius Quinctilius Varus in the same year at the Battle of the Teutoburg Forest, the plans for a greater German province were largely set aside. However, the altar itself retained some of its importance as the city is mentioned as “Ara Ubiorum” in many inscriptions.

Between 9 and AD 30 the area of present-day Cologne was mainly a garrison. Legio I Germanica and the Legio XX Valeria Victrix were stationed nearby. The place of the initial Roman Castra was known as Apud Aram Ubiorum (At the Altar of the Ubii).

The headquarters of Germanicus were located in Cologne from AD 13 to 17, when he was recalled by Tiberius. After the Battle of the Teutoburg Forest, Germanicus made efforts to stabilize the border region and to plan and carry out new offensives against the Germanic tribes located on the right bank of the Rhine. With the death of Augustus in AD 14 the legions garrisoned in Cologne mutinied with the aim of establishing Germanicus as emperor. These legions probably united in mutiny with those from Vetera stationed at their summer garrison in Castrum Novasium. Germanicus however remained loyal to Tiberius, who was heir to the throne. He dissuaded the legions from declaring him emperor and at the same time placated the mutineers through generous concessions.

Legio I was later stationed in Bonna (present-day Bonn) and Legio XX garrisoned Castrum Novaesium near present-day Neuss.

Promotion to Roman colony

Agrippina the younger was born in AD 15 in Cologne. She was the daughter of Germanicus and the wife of the Roman Emperor Claudius. She succeeded in convincing Claudius around 50 AD to elevate her birthplace to Colonia Claudia Ara Agrippinensium (Colony of Claudius and Altar of the Agrippinians). This gave Colonia the status of 'city' under Roman law and a Roman colony had many more imperial rights than an oppidum. At this time the city became the administrative capital of Germania Inferior. Before this time the area was not an official province, but an occupied area controlled and administrated initially by the military (exercitus Germaniae inferioris) and later temporarily defined as a tentative "Germania provincia".

From AD 70 on the city had a strong city wall that was c. 8 meters in height and 2.5 meters wide. However, the remains of the Roman city wall that can still be seen today are from the 3rd century AD. The unwalled portions of the city were equal to a square kilometer. Its most important steles and grave goods are preserved in the Romano-Germanic Museum.

The year of four emperors and Batavian revolt

In AD 68, the death of Emperor Nero caused a succession crisis in Rome. This led to a civil war throughout the empire. The Roman Senate installed Servius Sulpicius Galba as emperor, but he was quickly murdered by another contender for the throne, Marcus Salvius Otho, who had the backing of the Praetorian Guard. Meanwhile, the legions stationed in Colonia called for their commander Aulus Vitellius to be crowned as emperor. Vitellius marched on Italy at the head of the better part of the Rhine legions, and defeated Otho's troops at the First Battle of Bedriacum, in which Otho himself was killed.

A power vacuum occurred on the now undefended Rhine border. The Batavians rose and advanced on the empire from the Northeast of Germania Inferior. The majority of the inhabitants of Colonia remained Ubii, as they had not been fully romanised. They quickly sided with the Batavians. However, when the Batavians demanded that the city wall be torn down, the inhabitants of Colonia again sided with the Roman Empire.

Vitellius was overthrown eight months later by Titus Flavius Vespasianus, whose troops feared reprisals for having previously recognized Otho as emperor. Vitellius was killed and his body thrown into the Tiber.

Capital of the province Germania Inferior

With the founding of the province of Germania Inferior under Domitian in AD 89, the commander of the Legions of Lower Germania Colonia became the provincial governor, based in Colonia. In AD 80 a water supply was built, the Eifel Aqueduct, one of the longest aqueducts of the Roman Empire, which delivered 20,000 cubic metres of water to the city every day. Ten years later, the colonia became the capital of the Roman province of Lower Germany, Germania Inferior, with a total population of 20,000 people. The Rhine fleet was stationed south of the city at Alteburg. The fortress itself was destroyed in attacks by the Franks in AD 276. This area was later named Alte Burg, from which come the present day names "Alteburger Wall" and "Alteburger Platz".

With the elevation to provincial capital, Colonia was no longer a military base. The legions of the province were stationed in Vetera II near Colonia Ulpia Traiana (near present-day Xanten), Novaesium and Bonna. The name of the city varied in usage over time. In the 4th century AD it was known as Colonia Agrippina, which was shortened to Colonia sometime after the 5th century.

Late antiquity and the end of Roman rule
In AD 260 Postumus made Cologne the capital of the Gallic Empire, which included the Germanic and Gallic provinces, Britannia and the provinces of Hispania. The Gallic Empire lasted only fourteen years. By the 3rd century, only 20,000 people lived in and around the town as the city was badly affected by the crisis of the 3rd century.

In AD 310, Emperor Constantine I had a bridge over the Rhine constructed; this was guarded by the castellum Divitia (nowadays "Deutz"). In AD 321 Jews are documented in Cologne; when exactly the first Jews arrived in the Rhineland area cannot be established any more, but Cologne's Jewish community claims to be the oldest north of the Alps.

Colonia had to be temporarily abandoned in December 355 following a lengthy siege by the Franks. The archaeological strata of that time indicate that conquest and looting had catastrophic effects and the city lay in ruins. The Praetorium was reconstructed and enlarged circa 375 A.D. as seen in the model of the Roman-German Museum in Cologne The last dated reconstruction is from 392/393, when Arbogast, the Magister Militum of the Western half of the Empire, in the name of the emperor Eugenius renewed an unspecified public building. The city finally fell to the Ripuarian Franks in AD 459. Two lavish burial sites near the Cathedral date from this period of late antiquity.

Library
In Summer 2018, archaeologists declared that the foundations (located at ) that they discovered in 2017 during excavations to build a Protestant church, might be related to the "oldest known library in Germany", dating back to the 2nd century.

The library, which has characteristics similar to those of the Library of Celsus in the ancient city of Ephesus, might have contained more than 20,000 scrolls.

See also
 Roman governors of Germania Inferior
 History of Cologne
 History of the Jews in Cologne

Notes

References & further reading
Köln in römischer Zeit. Geschichte einer Stadt im Rahmen des Imperium Romanum. (vol. 1 of the history of the city of Cologne in 13 volumes). Greven, Köln 2004,  (German)

External links 

www.colonia3d.de, computer aided animations and renderings of CCAA by Köln International School of Design 
Oliver Meißner: Eine kurze Geschichte der Stadt Köln (German)
Köln on website of the Romano-Germanic Museum

Germania Inferior
History of Cologne
Roman towns and cities in Germany
Coloniae (Roman)
Roman towns in Germania